Independence Memorial Hall (also known as Independence Commemoration Hall) is a national monument in Sri Lanka built for commemoration of the independence of Sri Lanka from the British rule with the restoration of full governing responsibility to a Ceylonese-elected legislature on 4 February 1948. It is located in Independence Square (formerly Torrington Square) in the Cinnamon Gardens, Colombo. It also houses the Independence Memorial Museum.

The monument was built at the location where the formal ceremony marking the start of self-rule, with the opening of the first parliament by Prince Henry, Duke of Gloucester occurred at a special podium on 4 February 1948.

Located at the head of the monument is the statue of the first prime minister of the country Rt. Hon. Don Stephen Senanayake "The Father of the Nation". Most of the annual National Independence Day celebrations have been held here. Apart from a monument it served  as the ceremonial assembly hall for the Senate of Ceylon and the House of Representatives of Ceylon until the parliament was moved to the new parliament complex. Currently it is the venue for religious events and annual national day celebrations.

Design 

The building was designed by a group of eight notable architects led by Tom Neville Wynne-Jones CBE, and included F. H. Billimoria, Shirley de Alwis, Oliver Weerasinghe, Homi Billimoria, Justin Samarasekera and M. B. Morina. The design of the building is based on the Magul Maduwa (Celebration Hall), the Royal audience hall of the Kingdom of Kandy the last native kingdom of the island, where on 5 March 1815 the Kandyan Convention was signed between the British and the Kandyian Chieftains (Radalas) ending the Kingdom of Kandy.

In popular culture 
The Memorial Hall was featured as a pit stop on the 4th season of The Amazing Race Asia, the 1st season of The Amazing Race Australia, and the second season of the Israeli edition of The Amazing Race.

Events
 Independence Celebrations
 Oaths ceremony of President Maithripala Sirisena
 Funeral of President Ranasinghe Premadasa
 Funeral of Gamini Dissanayake
 Funeral of Lakshman Kadirgamar
 Funeral of W. D. Amaradeva
 Funeral of Vijaya Kumaratunga
 Funeral of Lester James Peries
Funeral of Ven. Gangodawila Soma Thero

See also 
Kandyan Convention
Sri Lankan independence movement
Cathedral of Christ the Living Saviour

References

External links 

Independence Hall, Lonely Planet
Independence Memorial Hall, asiaexplorers.com

Legislative buildings in Sri Lanka
Buildings and structures in Colombo
Monuments and memorials in Sri Lanka
Kingdom of Kandy
Government buildings in Colombo
Parks in Colombo
Tourist attractions in Colombo
1953 establishments in Ceylon
Buildings and structures completed in 1953